is a song by Japanese rock band Asian Kung-Fu Generation. It was released on July 13, 2016 and reached number 13 on the Oricon. It was used as the third opening for the 20th season of the anime Naruto Shippuden and the third song by Asian Kung-Fu Generation in the Naruto media, after "Haruka Kanata" and "Sore dewa, Mata Ashita". Masafumi Gotō said, "The offer came to places where there was no song, no idea, no time, but I could not find a reason to refuse, I thought that I had to write down even while I was sleeping." Single's B-side, Hakkei, sung by band's guitarist, Kensuke Kita. This is the fourth time since Re:Re:'s B-side, "Time Traveller" in 2016.

Music video
The music video for "Blood Circulator" was directed by Masaki Ōkita. At the beginning, video presented in black and red, with the band playing in a building. During bridge, the video presented normal and band playing in outside building. After that, they playing in a boxing ring and inside building again.

Track listing

Charts

References

Asian Kung-Fu Generation songs
2016 singles
Songs written by Masafumi Gotoh
2016 songs
Ki/oon Music singles
Naruto songs